Norman Archibald Macrae (N.A.M.) MacKenzie,  (January 5, 1894January 26, 1986) was the President of the University of British Columbia from 1944 to 1962, and a Senator from 1966 to 1969.

Biography
He was born in Pugwash, Nova Scotia. He fought during World War I. He studied law at Dalhousie, Harvard and Cambridge Universities. In 1927, he went to the University of Toronto, where he taught law for thirteen years. He became president of the University of New Brunswick in 1940. He was president of the University of British Columbia from 1944 to 1962. In 1959 he hosted Queen Elizabeth at the University of British Columbia's Faculty Club 
He was a member of the Senate from 1966 to 1969 representing the senatorial division of University-Point Grey, British Columbia.

In 1969, he was made a Companion of the Order of Canada.

He and his wife, born Margaret Thomas (1903–1987), had three children: Bridget Mackenzie (?-present), Susan Mackenzie (1928– 2011), and Patrick Thomas Mackenzie (1932-Jan 23 2006).

References

External links
 

1894 births
1986 deaths
Canadian legal scholars
Canadian senators from British Columbia
Canadian Companions of the Order of St Michael and St George
Companions of the Order of Canada
Fellows of the Royal Society of Canada
Liberal Party of Canada senators
Harvard Law School alumni
Members of the United Church of Canada
People from Cumberland County, Nova Scotia
Presidents of the University of British Columbia
Canadian recipients of the Military Medal
Canadian people of Scottish descent
Academic staff of the University of Toronto